Joseph E. Dillon (March 18, 1921 – April 17, 1990) was the mayor of Saint Paul, Minnesota from 1954 to 1960. During his tenure, in 1955, Saint Paul and Nagasaki became the first sister city pairing of an Asian city and an American city. A friend of Hubert Humphrey, Dillon campaigned for Humphrey during his 1960 presidential campaign.

References

Mayors of Saint Paul, Minnesota
Minnesota Democrats
1921 births
1990 deaths